Dmitry Vyacheslavovich Korolyov (born 15 April 1988) is a former Russian professional association football player.

Club career
He played in the Russian Football National League for FC Sportakademklub Moscow in 2008.

External links
 
 

1988 births
Living people
Russian footballers
Association football defenders
FC Torpedo Moscow players
FC Krasnodar players
FC Saturn Ramenskoye players
FC Sportakademklub Moscow players